Eifuku-ji (叡福寺) is a Buddhist temple in Minamikawachi, Osaka, Japan. It is affiliated with Shingon Buddhism. According to legend, it was founded in 724 by Emperor Shōmu.

See also 

Historical Sites of Prince Shōtoku

Buddhist temples in Osaka Prefecture
Kōyasan Shingon temples
Prince Shōtoku